Dmytro Nazarenko (born 14 September 1987) is a retired Ukrainian football defender.

Nazarenko was born in Donetsk and began playing professional football with FC Vorskla Poltava's second team. Unlike many footballers from Donetsk who dedicate their career to FC Shakhtar Donetsk, Nazarenko spent most of his career in neighboring Alchevsk. He would next spend 2.5 years with his hometown club FC Metalurh Donetsk, appearing in two Ukrainian Premier League and a few UEFA Europa League matches. He moved on loan to Stal Alchevsk for the 2008–09 Ukrainian First League season, and then went to FC Banants of the Armenian Premier League for a short-term loan in 2009.

References

External links

1987 births
Living people
Footballers from Donetsk
Ukrainian footballers
Ukrainian expatriate footballers
FC Vorskla-2 Poltava players
FC Metalurh Donetsk players
FC Stal Alchevsk players
FC Urartu players
FC Oleksandriya players
FK Spartaks Jūrmala players
FC Poltava players
MFC Mykolaiv players
MFC Mykolaiv-2 players
Expatriate footballers in Armenia
Ukrainian expatriate sportspeople in Armenia
Expatriate footballers in Latvia
Ukrainian expatriate sportspeople in Latvia
Armenian Premier League players
Latvian Higher League players
Association football defenders
Ukrainian football managers
FC Vast Mykolaiv managers